Prime Minister's Youth Programme was an initiative by the former prime minister of Pakistan Nawaz Sharif established in 2013.The purpose of the program was to ensure the provision of quality education, and meaningful employment to the youth through integrated, sustainable youth initiatives. The program provided government-subsidised business loans of up to 25 million rupees, under three tiers: first-tier for 10000 to 1 million, the second tier for 1 million to 10 million, and the third tier for 10 million to 25 million. The program also provided a skills scholarship program, a talent hunt for youth sports, and a national youth council.

The program was an expansion of the Prime Minister's Youth Programme''', launched in 2013. In July 2022 the State Bank of Pakistan paused disbursements to the Kamyab Jawan Program.

History 
The Prime Minister's Youth Programme was a special initiative launched by the Pakistani government in 2013 - 2018. The Youth Programme comprised several schemes including Prime Minister's Interest-Free Loan Scheme, Prime Minister's Youth Business Loans, Prime Minister's Youth Training Scheme, Prime Minister's Youth Skills Development Scheme, Prime Minister's Scheme for Provision of Laptops and Prime Minister's Scheme for Reimbursement of Fee of Students from the Less Developed Areas. It was headed by Maryam Nawaz Sharif. The total worth of PKR 20 billion was to be spread over 5 years.

On May 14, 2014, the government approved 3.5 billion for interest-free loans up to Rs 50,000 would be provided to 1 million people across the country. Half of the beneficiaries would be women. The loans would be disbursed through Pakistan Poverty Alleviation Fund (PPAF) and each federating unit will get its share as per the NFC Award, with a primary focus on rural areas. Proper loan centers and business support centers were to be set up across the country. The Prime Minister's Programme for the Provision of Laptops to Talented Students (Prime Minister's Laptop Scheme was launched on May 23, 2014.

The Prime Minister Laptop Scheme and other schemes were later abolished by the Pakistan Tehreek-e-Insaf (Pakistan Movement for Justice) government as of 2018.

In September 2019 the Prime Minister's Youth Programme was renamed to the Kamyab Jawan Program by the Imran Khan ministry.

In July 2022 the State Bank of Pakistan paused disbursements to the Kamyab Jawan Program.

References

Policies of Pakistan
2019 introductions
Pakistan Tehreek-e-Insaf
Imran Khan administration